Clonmoyle East is a townland within both the civil parish and catholic parish of Aghabullogue, County Cork, Ireland. It is 756.05 acres in size, situate east of Aghabullogue village, and north of Coachford village.

It is referred to as 'Clonmoile' in the Down Survey (Muskerry) map, and 'Clonmolye' with arable and course pasture land in the Down Survey (Parishes of Ahabollog and Aghinagh) map, with the terrier naming the proprietor as an Irish papist, Cormack MacCallaghan Carthy of the 'denomination of Clonmoyle', consisting of three ploughlands and c. 1521 acres considered 'entirely profitable'. The present combined acreage of Clonmoyle East with the adjoining townland of Clonmoyle West is c. 1530 acres.

The Ordnance Survey name book (c. 1840) gives the Irish language version of Cluain Maoile to the townland, or 'meadow of the hornless cow'. It was said to be the property of Rev. J.L. Pyne and Molly Davis, and excellent ground, mainly cultivated, with some bog and furze running through it. O'Donoghue (1986) holds the Irish version to be Cluain Mhaoil, meaning 'bare or bleak watershed', or possibly Cluain Maothaile meaning 'soft or spongy watershed'.  O'Murchú (1991) holds the correct version to be Cluain Mhaol meaning 'the bare meadow'.  The Placenames Database of Ireland gives an Irish name of Cluain Maol Thoir to the townland, with cluain meaning 'meadow' or 'pasture', and maol meaning 'bare' or 'flat-topped hillock', .

Townlands vary greatly in size, being territorial divisions within parishes in Ireland. Extensively used for land surveys, censuses and polling systems since the seventeenth century, townlands have also been used as the basis for rural postal addresses. In County Cork, surveying and standardisation of townland names and boundaries by the Ordnance Survey during the mid-nineteenth century, resulted in some earlier townland names disappearing, due to amalgamation or division. The townlands resulting from such surveys were employed during the Primary Land Valuation (Griffith's Valuation), subsequent censuses, and continue in use today.

Townland sites/items of interest
Clonmoyle House
Clonmoyle Mill
Leader's Aqueduct
Cottage House, Clonmoyle
Athnanangle Bridge
Luskin's Bridge
Colthurst's Bridge

References

External links
1841 surveyed OS map (maps.osi.ie)
1901 surveyed OS map (maps.osi.ie)
acrheritage.info

Townlands of County Cork